The Glen of the Downs is a 2 km long wooded glacial valley with steep sides rising to almost 250m on the east coast of Ireland. It contains a designated Nature Reserve comprising 59 ha, and is a Special Area of Conservation (SAC).

Location
The Glen is located in North County Wicklow. It is south of the capital Dublin in County Wicklow and lies between the villages of Kilmacanogue to the North and Kilpedder to the South.  From the Northern end both the Great Sugar Loaf and Little Sugar Loaf hills are visible. The village of Delgany is less than 2 km to the East.

The N11, a National Primary Route and part of European route E01, passes along the floor of the Glen as a dual carriageway between Junctions 9 and 10.  The upgrade to this road, completed in 2003, was delayed by protesters opposed on environmental grounds.

Geography
The valley was formed by the meltwater from a massive ice sheet.  The rocks forming the sides of are the same quartzite of the two Sugarloaf hills to the north. The Three Trouts river, actually a stream, flows through the southern end of the Glen before entering the sea south of Greystones.

Nature
The tree canopy is made up of broadleaf trees such as oak, cherry, rowan and ash. Beneath this canopy grows bilberry, bramble, wild garlic, holly, honeysuckle, ivy, woodrush and wood sage.

Birds include blackbird, blackcap, chaffinch, jay, robin, sparrowhawk, blue tit, great tit, grey wagtail and wren.  Some years, the rare wood warbler visits. Red squirrels are common as are sika deer, fox and badger.

History
The Glen has been written about since Victorian times with the view from the nearby Bellevue House described as 'a scene of luxurious softness, combined with grandeur and significance'. Bellevue House was the home of the La Touche family who settled in Ireland  as Huguenot refugees. Originally from England, their name derives from the La Touche commune in France.

Gallery

References

Forests and woodlands of the Republic of Ireland
Valleys of County Wicklow
Protected areas of County Wicklow